The Grand Som Martel (1,337 m) is a mountain of the Jura, located between Le Locle and Les Ponts-de-Martel in the canton of Neuchâtel.

References

External links
Grand Som Martel on Hikr

Mountains of the Jura
Mountains of the canton of Neuchâtel
Mountains of Switzerland
One-thousanders of Switzerland